Black Sabbath - 1970-1992 is a  video by heavy metal band Black Sabbath.

Tracks
"Black Sabbath"
"NIB"
"Behind the Wall of Sleep" 
"Paranoid"
"Hand of Doom"
"Children of the Grave"
"Snowblind"
"Symptom of the Universe"
"Sabbath Bloody Sabbath" 
"It's Alright"
"Hard Road"
"Neon Knights"
"Die Young"
"Headless Cross"
"Anno Mundi"
"Into the Void"
"Mob Rules"
"Children of the Grave"

Black Sabbath
Black Sabbath video albums